List of steroid esters may refer to:

 List of androgen esters – androgen esters
 List of estrogen esters – estrogen esters
 List of progestogen esters – progestogen esters
 List of corticosteroid esters – corticosteroid esters

See also
 List of steroids
 List of sex-hormonal medications available in the United States
 List of combined sex-hormonal preparations

References

Steroid esters
Chemistry-related lists
Lists of lists